Yana Olegovna Lukonina (born 26 September 1993 in Ryazan, Russia) is a retired Russian individual rhythmic gymnast. She is the 2010 Russian National all-around bronze medalist.

Career 
Lukonina relocated to Novogorsk at 12 years old and began training under Amina Zaripova. She became the 2008 European Junior champion in ball held in Torino, Italy and also won the Junior Team gold medal.

Lukonina debuted in senior at the 2010 Season, she competed at the 2010 Montreal World Cup finishing 10th in all-around and won silver in ribbon finals. Lukonina finished 6th in all-around at the 2010 St. Petersburg World Cup. She then won the all-around bronze medal at the 2010 Russian Championships. She won silver in ribbon and finished 4th in ribbon finals at the 2010 Corbeil-Essonnes World Cup and finished 10th in the all-around at the 2010 Pesaro World Cup. Lukonina was selected as part of the Russian Team for the 2010 World Championships held in Moscow where she won the gold medal in the team event (together with Evgenia Kanaeva, Daria Kondakova and Daria Dmitrieva).

Lukonina competed at the 2011 Montreal World Cup along with Margarita Mamun, Lukonina won gold in hoop and bronze medals in clubs and ribbon. She then won the all-around bronze at the 2011 Kyiv World Cup. Lukonina suffered a serious back injury and decided to complete her career in the 2012 Season.

References

External links
 
 Yana Lukonina Profile
 Rhythmic Gymnastics Results

1993 births
Living people
Russian rhythmic gymnasts
Sportspeople from Ryazan
Medalists at the Rhythmic Gymnastics World Championships
21st-century Russian women